The Kalamazoo Wings, nicknamed the K-Wings, are a mid-level professional ice hockey team in Kalamazoo, Michigan. A member of the ECHL's Western Conference, Central Division, they play in the 5,113-seat Wings Event Center. They are the affiliate of the Columbus Blue Jackets of the National Hockey League, and the Cleveland Monsters of the American Hockey League.

Kalamazoo is home to the "Green Ice Game". Played since 1982 on St. Patrick's Day, it is one of the most celebrated games in minor league hockey. The team has sought to duplicate the game's success with the Pink Ice Game (Valentine's Day), the Orange Ice Game (Halloween), the Lavender Ice game (Hockey Fights Cancer) and the Rainbow Ice game (Pride Night).

History

The team began in the 1999–2000 season as the United Hockey League's Madison Kodiaks in Madison, Wisconsin. After one season in Madison, the franchise moved to Kalamazoo, where it renamed itself the Wings in honor of the original Wings that had played in the International Hockey League from 1974 through 2000.  The new Wings obtained the right to use the old Wings' name and logo, as well as using the original team's history as its own.

The K-Wings played in the UHL from October 2000 until June 1, 2009, when they withdrew because of concerns that the league, which had renamed itself the International Hockey League in 2007, might go bankrupt. Eight days later, the K-Wings joined the ECHL. From September 13, 2012 until the end of the 2014–15 season, the Wings had an affiliation with the American Hockey League's Chicago Wolves. They were also affiliated with the National Hockey League's Columbus Blue Jackets and Vancouver Canucks as well as their AHL affiliates the Springfield Falcons and Utica Comets, respectively.

Prior to the 2015–16 season, the ECHL required teams to only have one official NHL/AHL affiliate, leading to the K-Wings only keeping their Columbus affiliation and the Blue Jackets' new AHL affiliate, the Lake Erie Monsters. They ended their affiliation with the Blue Jackets after one season and affiliated with the Tampa Bay Lightning and Syracuse Crunch for the 2016–17 season. They changed again for the 2017–18 season to the Canucks and Comets, their previous affiliates for several seasons.

Due to the COVID-19 pandemic, the Wings voluntarily suspended operations for the 2020–21 ECHL season. When the team returned for the 2021–22 season, they switched their affiliation back to the Columbus Blue Jackets. On June 23, 2022, the Wings signed an affiliation extension with the Blue Jackets (and therefore the Cleveland Monsters also) for the 2022-23 season

Season records

Players

Current roster
Updated November 23, 2022.

Retired numbers
 #1 Georges Gagnon
 #13 Tyler Willis
 #22 Mike Wanchuk
 #26 Kevin Schamehorn
 #27 Neil Meadmore

Team records

Single season
Goals: 46  Nick Bootland (2007–08)
Assists: 70  Daniel Carriere (2005–06)
Points: 94  Kory Karlander (2007–08)
Penalty minutes: 344  Tyler Willis (2003–04)
GAA: 2.02  Ryan Nie (2006–07)
SV%: .929  Ryan Nie (2006–07)

Career
Career games played: 614  Justin Taylor (2010–22)
Career goals: 237  Justin Taylor (2010–22)
Career assists: 263  Kory Karlander (2004–13)
Career points: 457  Justin Taylor (2010–22)
Career penalty minutes: 1,463  Tyler Willis (2003–10)
Career goaltending games played: 422  Joel Martin (2004-18)
Career goaltending wins: 152  Joel Martin (2004–18)
Career shutouts: 18  Joel Martin (2004–18)

References

External links 

 Kalamazoo Wings Official Website

ECHL teams
Professional ice hockey teams in Michigan
Ice hockey clubs established in 1999
Sports in Kalamazoo, Michigan
Philadelphia Flyers minor league affiliates
Columbus Blue Jackets minor league affiliates
Vancouver Canucks minor league affiliates
San Jose Sharks minor league affiliates
New York Islanders minor league affiliates
Tampa Bay Lightning minor league affiliates
1999 establishments in Wisconsin